Helmuth Baumann is an East German former Olympic javelin thrower. He represented his country in the men's javelin throw at the 1968 Summer Olympics. His distance was a 68.24 in the qualifiers, and a 68.26 in the finals.

References

1940 births
Living people
People from Oelsnitz, Vogtland
East German hammer throwers
Sportspeople from Saxony
Olympic athletes of East Germany
Athletes (track and field) at the 1968 Summer Olympics